Joel Luna Zárate (born November 12, 1965) is a Mexican former professional boxer. He is the former WBO Latino super flyweight champion and also the nephew of former world boxing champion Carlos Zárate.

Pro career
On April 25, 1998 Joel Luna fought Gerry Peñalosa for the WBC Super Flyweight title, but the bout ended in a technical draw.

See also
Notable boxing families

References

External links
 

Boxers from Mexico City
Super-flyweight boxers
1965 births
Living people
Mexican male boxers